Arnold Township may refer to:

 Arnold Township, Custer County, Nebraska
 Arnold Township, Ontario